The buk is a traditional Korean drum. While the term buk is a native Korean word used as a generic term meaning "drum" (the Sino-Korean word being go), it is most often used to refer to a shallow barrel-shaped drum, with a round wooden body that is covered on both ends with animal skin. Buk are categorized as hyeokbu (혁부) which are instruments made with leather, and has been used for jeongak (Korean court music) and folk music.

History

The buk used for court music are usually fixed with nails on the rims, while ones used for folk music are usually tied up with leather straps to form the shape. Performers in the court music usually beat their  with bukchae (북채, a drum stick) on one hand or two hands together, while drummers in the folk music commonly beat their  with it on their right hand as hitting the other side of the buk with their bare left hand. A while ago, even jong (종, bell) was referred to as "soebuk" (쇠북, metal drum) and included in the buk category.

Buk have been used for Korean music since the period of the Three Kingdoms of Korea (57 BC – 668 AD) in light of mural paintings in Anak Tomb of Goguryeo (37 BC – 668 AD) and records of Book of Sui on the kingdoms, Goguryeo and Baekje (18 BC – 660 AD). In the 3rd of Anak Tomb, two types of buk are depicted in the paintings titled Juakdo (주악도, "painting of playing music") and Haengryeoldo (행렬도,  "painting of marching") such as ipgo (입고) and damgo (담고) respectively. The ipgo is a buk that performers beat as standing, while the damgo is a buk that drummers strike as carrying it on their shoulder.

Among them  was also used for folk music, and later became the most commonly used instrument.

Usages

The pungmul-buk is one of the four instruments used in samul nori, a modern performance version of pungmul. It is played by striking a single stick (usually with the right hand) on only one of its heads.

It is struck with two padded sticks.

A modern set of buk (usually four) is called modeum buk (모듬북).photo They are typically placed horizontally on wooden stands and played with sticks.photo

Types

Janggu or Janggo (hangul: 장고 or 장구; hanja: 杖鼓 or 長鼓) – A double-headed hourglass-shaped drum played with one stick in each hand, or with one stick and one hand
Galgo (hangul: 갈고; hanja: 羯鼓) – Double-headed hourglass-shaped drum similar to the janggo but played with two sticks and thinner drum heads; sometimes called yanggo or yangjanggo; no longer commonly used 
Jingo (hangul: 진고; hanja: 晉鼓) – Largest barrel drum
Jeolgo (hangul: 절고;) – Barrel drum
Jwago (hangul: 좌고;) – A barrel drum in a wooden frame
Geongo (hangul: 건고;) – Huge barrel drum
Yonggo (hangul: 용고;) – A barrel drum with a dragon painted on its shell; used in daechwita
Eunggo (hangul: 응고;) – Barrel drum suspended from a frame
Sakgo – (hangul: 삭고;) – A long barrel drum suspended from a wooden frame
Gyobanggo (hangul: 교방고;) – Flat drum suspended from a frame
Junggo (hangul: 중고;) – Flat drum suspended from a frame; similar to the  but larger
Sogo (hangul: 소고;) – A small hand-held drum
Nogo (hangul: 노고;) – A set of two drums pierced by a pole
Nodo (hangul: 노도;) – A set of two small drums on a pole, which is twisted to play; used in ritual music
Yeongdo (hangul: 노도; hanja:) – Four drums on a pole, which is twisted to play; used in ritual music
Noedo (hangul: 뇌도;)) – six small drums hung in a frame; used in ritual music
Noego (hangul: 뇌고;) – Three small barrel drums on a pole, which is twisted to play; used in ritual music
Do (도) – single pellet drum on a pole

Gallery

See also
Traditional Korean musical instruments

References

The New Grove Dictionary of Music and Musicians, 2nd ed. S.v. "Puk," by Robert C. Provine.

Bibliography

 Samguk Sagi
 Goryeosa
 Book of Sui
 Akhak Gwebeom
 민요와 향토악기 (장사훈, 상문당, 1948)
 국악개요 (장사훈, 정연사, 1961)
 한국음악사전 (대한민국예술원, 1985)
 국악대사전 (장사훈, 세광음악출판사, 1984)

External links

Video showing  used in 
Video showing  used in 

Drums
Korean musical instruments
Asian percussion instruments